John Sheepshanks (1787–1863), British manufacturer and art collector, was born in Leeds, and became a partner in his father's business as a cloth manufacturer.

Sheepshanks collected pictures, mainly by British artists, and in 1857 presented his notable collection to the nation. These are at the Victoria & Albert Museum, London, which no longer observes all the conditions which he attached to the gift. He retired from business in 1833 and died a bachelor in 1863. His sister and brother were Anne Sheepshanks and Richard Sheepshanks.

References

External links
 John Sheepshanks at the Victoria & Albert Museum

1787 births
1863 deaths
English art collectors